Probole amicaria, known generally as the friendly probole or redcheeked looper, is a species of geometrid moth in the family Geometridae. It is found in North America.

The MONA or Hodges number for Probole amicaria is 6838.

References

Further reading

External links

 

Ennominae
Articles created by Qbugbot
Moths described in 1855